FK Crno Buki ZL is a football club based in the village of Crnobuki near Bitola, North Macedonia. They are currently competing in the Macedonian Third League (Southwest Division)

History
The club was founded in 1960.

References

External links
FK Crno Buki ZL at Facebook 
Club info at MacedonianFootball 
Macedonian Football Federation 

Football clubs in North Macedonia
FK
Association football clubs established in 1960
1960 establishments in the Socialist Republic of Macedonia